Tran Vang Sao (born Nguyễn Đính in 1942) is a Vietnamese poet.

He was born in Huế, where he now lives. His father was killed by the French during the First Indochina War. During the Vietnam War, he was a contributor to the underground newspaper Thanh Niên Chống Mỹ [Youths against America] . He joined the National Liberation Front in 1965, lived in areas under its control, broadcasting propaganda until 1969, when he was injured and removed to the north . In spite of his allegiance to the Communist cause during the war—his pen name, "Vàng Sao", means "Yellow Star", a reference to the national flag—he has been blacklisted since 1972.

He had been imprisoned , and his manuscripts have been confiscated . His poems have been translated into English and published in the journals American Poetry Review (Vol.28/No.1, Jan/Feb 1999) and The Literary Review (Winter 1999).

External links 
four poems, translated into English by Linh Dinh
Tôi bị bắt, a prison memoir (in Vietnamese)

1942 births
Living people
20th-century Vietnamese poets
Vietnamese male poets
20th-century male writers